Half Assini Senior High School is a coeducational senior high school located at Half Assini in the Western Region of Ghana.

History
The school was one of the schools founded by the first president of Ghana, Dr. Kwame Nkrumah. He founded the school with sixty students and four teachers. The school was among the few early established schools in the country (Modern Ghana) and it attracted the best of brains across the continent. Most of the infrastructure in the school now was originally put up by Nkrumah, and sincerely it had one of the best science resource centers in the country at the time.

Student body
The school has about 1,500 students.

See also

 Education in Ghana
 List of senior high schools in Ghana
 PeaceJam Ghana

References

1960 establishments in Ghana
Educational institutions established in 1960
High schools in Ghana
Public schools in Ghana
Education in the Western Region (Ghana)